Heterocnephes scapulalis is a moth of the family Crambidae. It is found on Ambon, Peninsular Malaysia and New Guinea.

References

Moths described in 1863
Pyraustinae